The PNR 2500 class is a class of 43 GE U10B Diesel Electric Locomotives first introduced in 1965 with the delivery of the first 13 locomotives of the class. The locomotives were previously used for long haul services in the PNR North Main Line and the PNR South Main Line.

Build numbers
The following are the build numbers of the PNR 2500 class.

Status
As of March 2022, only 1 unit is active, 1 unit is transferred to Caloocan workshops after being used as a Bicol commuter hauler, 1 unit is beyond economical repair, and 40 units were scrapped.

Parts acquisition
Parts for only 1 active locomotive are sourced from inactive locomotives as new parts for the U10B are not available.

Gallery

See also
PNR 900 Class
PNR 5000 Class

References

Philippine National Railways
Rolling stock of the Philippines
3 ft 6 in gauge locomotives
Railway locomotives introduced in 1965